No Boundaries, an album by Natalie MacMaster, was released in 1997 on the Rounder Records label.

Track listing
 "The Honeysuckle Set" – 5:42
 "My Friend Buddy" – 4:07
 "Fiddle & Bow" (with Bruce Guthro) – 5:10
 "Reel Beatrice" – 3:30
 "Paddy Leblanc's Set" – 5:54
 "Silverwells" – 3:40
 "The Drunken Piper" – 4:07
 "Catharsis" – 2:30
 "Where's Howie?" – 3:46
 "Bill Crawford's Set" – 3:28
 "The Beaumont Rag" – 3:31
 "The Autograph" – 5:58
 "Rev. Archie Beaton" – 2:27

Sources and links

Natalie MacMaster albums
1997 albums